Maroncourt is a commune in the Vosges department in Grand Est in northeastern France.

Geography
Located a few kilometres to the south of Mirecourt and roughly fifteen kilometres (nine miles) to the west-north-west of Épinal, Maroncourt is the least populous commune in the department. It has no church, but falls within the parish of Hymont to the north.

Forest covers 71 of the commune's 224 hectares:  the rest is devoted to agriculture.

The river Madon flows through the commune.

History
An early mention dates from 1159, when a charter addressed by the Bishop of Toul, Henry of Lorraine to the Abbey of Chaumousey confirms the gift of title to the Abbey of Maroncourt (Moiruncourt) made by Foulques of Saint-Vast and his wife Mélisende.   The lands were still held by Chaumousey following a territorial consolidation that took place in 1595.

Population

See also
Communes of the Vosges department

References

Communes of Vosges (department)